Stuyvesant Falls is a hamlet in the town of Stuyvesant in Columbia County, New York, United States. The zipcode is: 12174. It was called Glencadia in the 18th century and well into the 19th century, the name having changed sometime after 1848. The French—Scottish derivatives of Glencadia apparently mean a "creek region of simple pleasures."

The hamlet includes a substantial textile mill dating to 1827 and a hydro-electric plant. The word "Glencadia" is popular with local businesses and organizations, including the dairy Glencadia Farms, the Glencadia Rod and Gun Club, and Glencadia Dog Camp.

References

External links
  Town of Stuyvesant, NY 
  Historical information about Stuyvesant
  Database of tax and meeting documents

Hamlets in Columbia County, New York
Hamlets in New York (state)